Pedimental sculptures are sculptures within the frame of a pediment on the exterior of a building, some examples of which can be found in Canada. Pedimental sculpture poses special challenges to sculptors: the triangular composition limits the choices for figures or ornament at the ends, and the sculpture must be designed to be viewed both from below and from a distance.

History 

As with the ancient Greeks, and the Roman architects and sculptors who followed them, North American artists had two different structural approaches creating pedimental sculpture. They are either freestanding statues that stand on the bed (the ledge or cornice that creates the bottom of the pediment), or they can be relief sculpture, attached to the back wall of the pediment.

Compositionally, the restrictions imposed by both the physical triangular shape of a pediment, and the traditional themes that are usually employed for the subject matter, are, according to Ernest Arthur Gardner, "as exactly regulated as that of a sonnet or a Spenserian stanza: the artist has liberty only in certain directions and must not violate the laws of rhythm".

The Golden Dog 

Perhaps the most famous pedimental sculpture in Quebec is Le Chien d'Or (1688) in Quebec City. The gray limestone relief panel depicts a dog gnawing a bone, a metaphor for nursing a grudge.

Timothée Roussel (1639-1700), a French immigrant and surgeon, was a Quebec City landowner in New France, and Jean Normand was his neighbor. The two bickered over right of passage across Normand's land, and Roussel won in court over Normand in 1682 and 1683. The men eventually came to blows, and wound up in court again in 1686. The court record noted that Normand's son Joseph had killed Roussel's dog.

Two years later, Roussel built a house on Buade Street, and affixed the bas relief panel over his front door. It featured a menacing inscription:"I am a dog that gnaws his bone / I couch and gnaw it all alone / A time will come, which is not yet / When I'll bite him by whom I'm bit." (Translation by William Kirby, 1877.)

Merchant Nicolas Jacquin, dit Philibert bought the house from Roussel's heirs in 1734, and greatly expanded it. The merchant was murdered in 1748. Philibert's house was later converted into a coffeehouse, was the meeting place for Freemasons from 1775 to 1800, and served as the city's post office from 1845 to 1871. The house was demolished for construction of a large Second Empire post office building, completed in 1872. Roussel's panel was mounted high above its side entrance.

Author William Kirby made the relief panel the centerpiece of his 1877 historical novel The Golden Dog. The lead character was Philibert's son, who tracks down his father's killer and avenges the murder. The novel helped to make Le Chien d'Or famous, but also popularized the urban legend that the relief panel was erected as a threat to Philibert's murderer.

The post office building was expanded and remodeled in a Beaux-Arts style in 1913. The then-225-year-old relief was relocated to a more prominent location, a segmental pediment over the building's new entrance porch.

Manitoba Legislative Building 

The 1911-1912 British-Empire-wide design competition for the Manitoba Legislative Building in Winnipeg had 67 entrants, and was won by Scottish architect Frank Worthington Simon. He chose Scottish sculptor Albert Hodge to design its sculptured main pediment. Hodge died in 1918 at age 42, three years prior to the building's completion. Piccirilli Brothers of New York City carved Hodge's pedimental figures in limestone.
The pediment group which was modelled by the late Albert Hodge, of London, attracts attention first by its conspicuous situation as well as by its artistic quality. In judging such a group it must be borne in mind that the height above the eye, its peculiar confining frame and the necessities of its composition make it one of the most difficult of sculptural problems. Mr. Hodge, however, has most successfully developed his subject, filling the outer acute angles of the pediment as well as the high apex, the composition being balanced on either side and culminating at the centre. The female figure of Manitoba sits full front in the middle, and to the left there are three distinct groups, connected and related to the central figure by sentiment and gesture. In the corner Enterprise beckons the workers to the Land of Promise. Next there is a finely modelled bull led by Europa typifying the emigration from Europe, and between this group and Manitoba, there are a father, mother and child—the new family in the new world. On the opposite side of the angle are two figures clasping a jar whence issues a stream of water fertilizing the earth—the confluence of the Red and Assiniboine rivers. Next is a group of ploughmen and horses, tilling the soil, balancing the Bull-and-Europa group. Between these and Manitoba is a group of a man and a woman bringing the fruits of the soil, balancing the family group. Thus are expressions and balance complete, scale maintained, and the space well filled.Mr. Hodge's work is also seen in the two sphinxes, representing Wisdom and Knowledge, placed on either side of the main pediment, and in the group of two figures, personifying, respectively, Peace and War, above the east and west pediments.

Pedimental sculptures

See also
 Architecture of Canada
 Pedimental sculpture
 Pedimental sculptures in the United States

References

External links

Pedimental sculpture
Outdoor sculptures in Canada
Lists of public art in Canada